Jacky Ido (born 14 May 1977) is a Burkinabé-born French actor. His first role was as Lemalian in the 2005 German film, The White Masai. He is best known to English-language audiences for his role as Marcel, the film projectionist in Quentin Tarantino's 2009 film, Inglourious Basterds. Ido's brother Cédric Ido, who is also an actor, has directed him in the short Hasaki Ya Suda. Ido works and resides in Paris, France and, as of 2010, is working on an album of slam poetry.

In 2014, Ido starred as Leo Romba in the short lived French-American television series Taxi Brooklyn. In 2015, he was cast opposite Mireille Enos in the ABC legal thriller, The Catch produced by Shonda Rhimes.

Filmography

Film

Television

References

External links

1977 births
Living people
French male television actors
French male film actors
Burkinabé emigrants to France
21st-century Burkinabé male actors
Outstanding Performance by a Cast in a Motion Picture Screen Actors Guild Award winners
Male actors from Paris
People from Ouagadougou
21st-century French male actors
Burkinabé male film actors
Burkinabé male television actors